Scutellastra tabularis is a species of sea snail, a true limpet, a marine gastropod mollusk in the family Patellidae, one of the families of true limpets.

Description

Distribution
This marine species occurs off the south coast of South Africa.

References

 Kilburn, R.N. & Rippey, E. (1982) Sea Shells of Southern Africa. Macmillan South Africa, Johannesburg, xi + 249 pp. page(s): 38
 Koufopanou et al. (1999). A molecular phylogeny of the patellid limpets (Gastropoda: Patellidae) and its implications for the origins of their antitropical distribution Mol. Phylogenet. Evol. 11(1):138-156

External links
 Branch, G.M. et al. (2002). Two Oceans. 5th impression. David Philip, Cate Town & Johannesburg

Endemic fauna of South Africa
Patellidae
Gastropods described in 1848
Taxa named by Christian Ferdinand Friedrich Krauss